Luca Fazzini (born 17 March 1995) is a Swiss professional ice hockey forward. He is currently playing with HC Lugano of the Swiss National League (NL).

Fazzini made his senior NLA debut playing with Lugano during the 2012–13 NLA season.

Career statistics

Regular season and playoffs

International

References

External links

1995 births
Living people
Swiss ice hockey forwards
HC Lugano players
SC Rapperswil-Jona Lakers players
HCB Ticino Rockets players
Sportspeople from Lugano